Rhasidat Adeleke (born 29 August 2002) is an Irish sprinter. She won the 100 metres / 200 m double at the 2021 European Athletics Under-20 Championships.

Adeleke holds six Irish national records (60 m indoors, 200 m out and indoors, 300 m indoors, and 400 m out and indoors).

Background
Adeleke was born in Dublin in 2002 to Nigerian parents Ade and Prince Adeleke. She is a member of Tallaght Athletic Club.

Career
In 2017, 14-year-old Rhasidat Adeleke won a junior sprint double at the Irish Schools championships for Presentation College, Terenure. A month later, she claimed the silver medal in the 200 metres at the European Youth Olympic Festival held in Győr, Hungary. The following year, she took gold in the event at the European Under-18 Championships staged also in Győr, and a silver at the World U20 Championships in Tampere, Finland competing in the heats of the 4 x 100 m relay with Molly Scott, Gina Akpe-Moses, Ciara Neville and Patience Jumbo-Gula. In 2019, she claimed the 100 m / 200 m sprint double at the European Youth Olympic Festival held in Baku, Azerbaijan.

In 2021, still 18, Adeleke won her first senior national outdoor title followed by winning the 100 m / 200 m sprint double at the European U20 Championships in Tallinn, Estonia, the first women’s sprint double at these championships since 2011. That same year, she took up a scholarship with the University of Texas and competed in the US Collegiate Indoor Championships.

In August 2022, she placed fifth in the 400 metres final at the European Championships held in Munich, setting a national record time of 50.53 seconds.

On 21 January 2023, the 20-year-old broke the Irish indoor 200 m record with a world-leading time of 22.52 s, the fastest time by a European woman since 2003, at the Martin Luther King Invitational in Albuquerque, New Mexico (at altitude). On 4 February, also in Albuquerque, she set a new Irish indoor record in the 400 m with a world-leading 50.45 s, the fastest time in history indoors or out by an Irish woman, at the UNM Collegiate Classic. On 25 February at the Big 12 Indoor Championships in Lubbock, Texas, Adeleke lowered her best to 50.33 s, breaking the NCAA record and putting her 13th on the respective world all-time list. On 11 March, she ran 50.45 s at the NCCA Indoors final, again in Albuquerque, earning the silver medal, and picked up a second silver just one hour later when she anchored the Texas women's 4 × 400 m relay team, with a split of 50.77s.

Achievements

International competitions

1Time from the heats; Adeleke was replaced in the final.

National & NCAA titles
 Irish Athletics Championships
 100 metres: 2021, 2022
 Irish Indoor Athletics Championships
 200 metres: 2019
 2022 NCAA Division I Outdoor Track and Field Championships
 4 x 100 m relay: 2022

References

External links
 

Living people
2002 births
Black Irish sportspeople
Irish female sprinters
Irish people of Nigerian descent
Irish sportspeople of African descent
Sportspeople from South Dublin (county)
Sportspeople from County Dublin
21st-century Irish women